The 1993 Canadian Grand Prix was a Formula One motor race held at the Circuit Gilles Villeneuve in Montreal, Quebec, Canada on 13 June 1993. It was the seventh race of the 1993 Formula One World Championship. The 69-lap race was won from pole position by Alain Prost, driving a Williams-Renault, with Michael Schumacher second in a Benetton-Ford and Prost's teammate Damon Hill third.

Report

Qualifying
There was a two by two formation in qualifying in Canada as the Williams were ahead of the Benettons and the Ferraris. Prost took pole ahead of Hill, Schumacher, Patrese, Berger and Alesi. Uncharacteristically, Senna was down in 8th.

Race
At the start, Hill beat Prost away, while the Benettons were slow and were passed by Berger and Senna (who had already got ahead of Brundle and then Alesi). Hill was leading Prost, Berger, Senna, Schumacher and Patrese.

Senna passed Berger for third on lap 2. On lap 6, Prost took the lead from Hill. Soon afterwards, Schumacher passed Berger with Patrese following him through five laps later. The order stabilised at: Prost, Hill, Senna, Schumacher, Patrese and Berger.

During the mid-race stops, Hill had a problem and dropped behind Senna and Schumacher. Schumacher now set off after Senna. Senna's alternator eventually gave out and he retired from the race. Prost won ahead of Schumacher, Hill, Berger, Brundle and Wendlinger.

This is the last race on which 1976 Formula One champion James Hunt commentated for Grand Prix for the BBC. He died barely 48 hours after the race.

Classification

Qualifying

Race

Championship standings after the race

Drivers' Championship standings

Constructors' Championship standings

References

Canadian Grand Prix
Canadian Grand Prix
Grand Prix
Grand Prix